Jens Keller (born 24 November 1970) is a German football manager and former player who played as a defender. He last coached 1. FC Nürnberg.

Playing career
Keller played professionally for VfB Stuttgart, TSV 1860 München, VfL Wolfsburg, 1. FC Köln and Eintracht Frankfurt.

Managerial career

VfB Stuttgart
On 13 October 2010, Keller became interim manager of VfB Stuttgart until a permanent appointment had been found. He was replaced by Bruno Labbadia after two months in charge of the team on 12 December 2010. He finished with a record of five wins, three draws, and five losses.

FC Schalke 04
On 16 December 2012, Keller was promoted from his position as the U17 coach to be the new head coach. His contract for Schalke 04 was set to last until the end of the season. On 10 May 2013, Keller's contract with Schalke 04 was extended for two more seasons.

After only two wins in 10 matches in the 2014–15 season, Keller was sacked on 7 October 2014 and succeeded by Roberto Di Matteo as head coach. He finished with a record of 36 wins, 16 draws, and 24 losses.

Union Berlin
On 11 April 2016, Keller was announced as the new manager of 2. Bundesliga side Union Berlin for the start of their 2016–17 campaign. His contract goes to 30 June 2018.

On 4 December 2017, Keller was sacked and replaced by André Hofschneider. He finished with a record of 27 wins, 12 draws, and 15 losses.

FC Ingolstadt
He was appointed as the new head coach of FC Ingolstadt on 2 December 2018. He was sacked on 2 April 2019.

1. FC Nürnberg
Keller was hired by 1. FC Nürnberg on 12 November 2019. He was sacked on 29 June 2020.

Managerial statistics

References

External links

Jens Keller's Fussballwelt 

1970 births
Living people
German footballers
German football managers
VfB Stuttgart players
VfB Stuttgart II players
TSV 1860 Munich players
VfL Wolfsburg players
1. FC Köln players
Eintracht Frankfurt players
Bundesliga players
2. Bundesliga players
VfB Stuttgart managers
FC Schalke 04 managers
1. FC Union Berlin managers
FC Ingolstadt 04 managers
1. FC Nürnberg managers
Bundesliga managers
2. Bundesliga managers
Footballers from Stuttgart
Association football defenders